Bolivia competed at the 1980 Winter Olympics in Lake Placid, United States.  It was the first time in 24 years that Bolivian athletes had competed at the Winter Games.

Alpine skiing

Men

References
Official Olympic Reports
 Olympic Winter Games 1980, full results by sports-reference.com

Nations at the 1980 Winter Olympics
1980 Winter Olympics
1980 in Bolivian sport